Austin Channing Brown (born Oct. 6, 1984) is an American writer and public speaker. She is Executive Producer of web series The Next Question and the author of I’m Still Here: Black Dignity in a World Made for Whiteness, which became a New York Times best seller following the murder of George Floyd and subsequent protests. Her work is focused on sharing and platforming black women experiences in contemporary America. She continues to hold a "day job" working as Resident Director and Multicultural Liaison for Calvin College where she manages student resident halls.

Early life and education
Brown was given the name Austin, her grandmother's maiden name, because her parents thought that it would improve her chances of employment later in life, if on paper she had a name that sounded like one of a white man. At the age of ten, Brown's parents separated, she lived with her father but spent summers with her mother in Cleveland, who lived in a primarily Black neighbourhood.

She attended a predominately white elementary school where she has said she felt "erased" and "discounted". She then attended a Catholic high school and a Christian college.   She went on to attend North Park University and gained a Bachelor of Arts in business management. She later gained Master of Arts in social justice from Marygrove College.

Social activism 
Brown has frequently delivered speeches and lecturers at universities, churches, and festivals across the US on issues of racism and social justice. She has previously worked for non-profit organisations tackling systemic issues of American social life such as homelessness and youth engagement.

References 

1984 births
Living people
21st-century American writers
21st-century American women writers
American public speakers